Ride Me is the first Japanese studio album of South Korean pop duo Donghae & Eunhyuk, a subgroup of the boy band Super Junior. The album was released on February 26, 2014 under Avex Trax in Japan.

Background
Donghae & Eunhyuk revealed during Super Show 5 in Osaka that they would release their first album, followed by their first tour, in Japan. Their first album, Ride Me was released on February 26, 2014. "Motorcycle" was the lead single of the album. The short version music video was released through Avex's YouTube channel on February 2. The song became the main theme of the Japanese TV show, 'Sukkiri'. The album also includes the song "Teenage Queen" which was originally created and written in English by 5 Seconds of Summer.

Track listing

DVD
 "Motorcycle" music video
 "Oppa, Oppa" music video
 "I Wanna Dance" music video
 "Motorcycle" music video making clip
 Ride Me JK making clip

Oricon

References

External links
 Official Japanese Avex website of Super Junior Donghae & Eunhyuk

SM Entertainment albums
2014 albums
Avex Group albums